Joseph Dominic Vitale (born August 20, 1985) is an American former professional ice hockey player and the current radio color analyst for the St. Louis Blues. Vitale was drafted 195th overall in the 2005 NHL Entry Draft by the Pittsburgh Penguins, with whom he made his NHL debut. He also played with the Arizona Coyotes.

Playing career

Amateur
As a youth, Vitale played in the 1999 Quebec International Pee-Wee Hockey Tournament with the St. Louis Blues minor ice hockey team.

Vitale graduated from Christian Brothers College High School in St. Louis, Missouri, where he was part of three state championships and two undefeated seasons. He also played for the St. Louis Jr. Blues of the Central States Hockey League for two seasons, including a national championship in 2003–04. In 2004–05, he played for the Sioux Falls Stampede of the United States Hockey League.

On July 30, 2005, Vitale was drafted by the Penguins with the 195th selection in the 2005 NHL Entry Draft. He enrolled in Northeastern University and began his college career as a freshman for the Huskies in 2005–06. He was named Hockey East Rookie of the Week in February and received Northeastern's Ed Arrington Memorial Rookie of the Year Award. In 2006–07, he was named alternate captain of the squad as a sophomore and was named to Hockey East's All-Academic Team. As a junior in 2007–08, he was named All-New England and New England's Most Improved Player, was named to the All-Hockey East Second Team, and was Northeastern's Most Valuable Player. Vitale's college career concluded when Northeastern lost to Cornell in the first round of the NCAA tournament, Northeastern's first trip to the NCAA tournament in 15 years. He finished his career at Northeastern with 34 goals and 60 assists for 94 points and 268 penalty minutes in 143 games.

Professional

Pittsburgh Penguins
On April 3, 2009, Vitale signed a one-year, entry level NHL contract with the Pittsburgh Penguins for the 2009–10 season. He also signed an Amateur Try-Out contract with the Wilkes-Barre/Scranton Penguins for the remainder of the 2008–09 season.  He recorded his first professional goal and assist on April 4, 2009 against the Albany River Rats. He finished the season with 4 points in 5 regular season games. Vitale also played in all 12 of the Penguins playoff games. During the 2009–10 season, Vitale played in 74 games in the AHL, scoring six goals and recording 26 assists for a total of 32 points. In January 2010, the Penguins and Vitale agreed to a two-year contract extension through the 2011–12 season.

Vitale made his NHL debut with the Pittsburgh Penguins on February 10, 2011 against the Los Angeles Kings. On February 16, 2011, Vitale scored his first NHL goal against Peter Budaj of the Colorado Avalanche.

On February 3, 2012, Vitale was re-signed by the Pittsburgh Penguins to a two-year contract extension worth $1.1 million.

Arizona Coyotes
As a free agent, Vitale joined his second NHL team, signing a three-year contract with the Arizona Coyotes on July 1, 2014. In his second year with the Coyotes, Vitale began the 2015–16 NHL season. On October 17, 2015, Vitale was injured in his first game of the year against Boston Bruins. In a fight against Kevan Miller, Vitale suffered a fractured orbital bone and was expected to miss 4–6 weeks. Suffering lingering concussion issues as a result of the fight, Vitale was unable to make progress and on February 11, 2016, he was ruled out for the remainder of the 2015–16 season.

Detroit Red Wings
On June 24, 2016, the Coyotes traded Vitale, the 20th overall pick, and the 53rd overall pick in the 2016 NHL Entry Draft, to the Detroit Red Wings in exchange for Pavel Datsyuk's $7.5 million cap hit and the 16th overall pick. Due to a concussion that sidelined Vitale for all but one game of the previous season, he sat out the entirety of the 2016–17 season and, with his contract expiring that year, he never played a game for the Red Wings. Vitale retired in July 2017 due to his career-ending concussion.

Post-playing career
On August 15, 2018, St. Louis native Vitale was named as the new radio color analyst of the St. Louis Blues on KMOX, the team's flagship station.

Career statistics

Awards and honors

References

External links

1985 births
Living people
Arizona Coyotes players
Ice hockey people from St. Louis
Northeastern Huskies men's ice hockey players
Phoenix Coyotes players
Pittsburgh Penguins draft picks
Pittsburgh Penguins players
Sioux Falls Stampede players
Wilkes-Barre/Scranton Penguins players
American men's ice hockey centers